Independence of Lithuania or Lithuanian independence may refer to:

Lithuanian independence movement
 The Act of Independence of Lithuania of February 16, 1918
 Lithuanian Wars of Independence, 1918-1920
 June Uprising in Lithuania
Proclamation of the Provisional Government of Lithuania of June 23, 1941
 The Act of the Re-Establishment of the State of Lithuania of March 11, 1990